Ba Monir (also Romanized as Bā Monīr; also known as Bāb Monīr) is a village in Cheghapur Rural District of Kaki District, Dashti County, Bushehr province, Iran. At the 2006 census, its population was 430 in 81 households. The following census in 2011 counted 467 people in 115 households. The latest census in 2016 showed a population of 417 people in 129 households; it was the largest village in its rural district.

References 

Populated places in Dashti County